The 2009 Asian Indoor Games, officially the 3rd Asian Indoor Games and also known as Vietnam 2009, were a pancontinential indoor multi-sport event held in Vietnam from 30 October till 8 November 2009. This was the last edition of the event to be held under the "Asian Indoor Games" name before it was merged with another Olympic Council of Asia (OCA) event – Asian Martial Arts Games to form the larger Asian Indoor and Martial Arts Games.

Mascot
The mascot of the 2009 event is the Ho chicken (Gà Hồ), a rare and distinctly Vietnamese breed of chicken. In Vietnamese culture, the chicken (particularly the rooster) have the five qualities of a man of honour: literacy, martial arts, physical strength, humanity and loyalty. The symbolism in the context of the AIGs is that the rooster mascot rising to welcome the sun is linked to the readiness of the sports industry of Vietnam to host this major event.

Venues

 Hanoi
 Mỹ Đình National Stadium
 My Dinh Indoor Athletics Gymnasium
 My Dinh National Aquatics Sports Complex
 Quan Ngua Sports Palace
 Tu Liem Gymnasium
 Trinh Hoai Duc Gymnasium
 Ha Tay Gymnasium
 Hai Ba Trung Gymnasium
 Cau Giay Gymnasium
 Gia Lam Gymnasium
 Soc Son Gymnasium
 Gymnasium of Hanoi University of Technology
 Ho Chi Minh City
 Tan Binh Gymnasium
 Phu Tho Indoor Stadium
 Lang Binh Thang Gymnasium
 University of Pedagogy Competition Hall
 Rach Mieu Gymnasium
 Van Don Gymnasium
 Quan Khu 7 Gymnasium
 Phan Dinh Phung Gymnasium
 Nguyen Du Gymnasium
 Superbowl Center
 Hai Phong
 Haiphong Youth Gymnasium
 Haiphong Gymnasium
 Quảng Ninh
 Quang Ninh Gymnasium
 Halong Pearl Halong
 Bắc Ninh
 Bac Ninh Gymnasium
 Hải Dương
 Haiduong Gymnasium

Participating nations

All of OCA members participated in the Games, excluding: Pakistan, Palestine, & Timor-Leste. In the brackets are the total numbers of the athletes.

Non-competing nations
Only one country just sent officials.

Sports
The 2009 Asian Indoor Games did not feature indoor cycling, extreme sports and indoor hockey which were played in the previous games. All of the demonstration sports in the 2007 Asian Indoor Games namely, 3 on 3 basketball, kurash and kickboxing, were included in this year's Asian Indoor Games.

Demonstration sports
 Ju-jitsu & belt wrestling

Calendar

Medal table

References

External links
 Website
 VAIGOC 2009 Official site
 Ho Chi Minh City's Official site

 
2009 in multi-sport events
2009
2009 in Vietnamese sport
International sports competitions hosted by Vietnam
2009 in Asian sport
Multi-sport events in Vietnam